Quaker bonnets may refer to historic headwear worn by Quaker women, or:
 Lupinus perennis
 Lupinus polyphyllus